Ernesto Billiones or better known as Egay Billiones is a Filipino Professional basketball player who plays for the Muntinlupa Cagers of the Maharlika Pilipinas Basketball League. He has played in the Philippine Basketball Association and the ASEAN Basketball League.

Career
He was selected by the Gin Kings in the 2000 PBA Draft but was dropped. Billones decided to play in the PBL for Blu Detergent.

He played for Air21 (FedEx) from 2002-2006 before being signed by Talk 'N Text in 2007. He was released in early 2008. In the ASEAN Basketball League, he played for the Philippine Patriots.

Billones debuted at the Maharlika Pilipinas Basketball League with the Muntinlupa Cagers in February 2018.

References

1975 births
Barako Bull Energy players
Living people
Filipino men's basketball players
Magnolia Hotshots players
Basketball players from Aklan
Point guards
TNT Tropang Giga players
Maharlika Pilipinas Basketball League players
Hiligaynon people
College basketball players in the Philippines
Barangay Ginebra San Miguel draft picks